TAP Maintenance & Engineering – the maintenance, repair and operations center of TAP Air Portugal airline – is located at Portela Airport, Lisbon, Portugal.

History 
Created in 1945 as the embryonic maintenance department of the newborn Portuguese national airline. In March 2007, TAP Maintenance & Engineering had 1,830 workers. At its main base, located at Lisbon Airport, there were 1,794 workers; the remainder staffed the outstations of Francisco Sá Carneiro at Porto, Faro Airport at Faro, Madeira Airport at Funchal, Quatro de Fevereiro Airport at Luanda, Angola, Galeão International Airport at Rio de Janeiro and Salgado Filho International Airport, Porto Alegre, Brazil. TAP Maintenance & Engineering, with its owner TAP Portugal, bought 90% of Brazilian VEM Maintenance & Engineering from Varig in November 2005. In January 2009, VEM changed its corporate name to TAP Maintenance & Engineering Brazil.

TAP M&E capabilities 
Airbus A310
Airbus A318
Airbus A319
Airbus A320
Airbus A321
Airbus A340
Boeing 737
Lockheed L-1011

Engines
CFM56-3
CFM56-5A
CFM56-5B
CFM56-5C
CFM56-7
JT8D
JT3D
RB211
CF6-80

TAP M&E clients 
Besides TAP Portugal there are some other airlines that do or did maintenance at TAP Maintenance & Engineering, like:
FedEx Express A310s
Air Transat A310s, A330s
BWIA West Indies Airways A340s
NATO 707s
Conviasa A340

TAP M&E Brazil 
TAP M&E Brazil (formerly VEM - Varig Maintenance & Engineering) is a company of TAP Portugal Group that is between 10 largest aircraft and component maintenance, repair and overhaul (MRO) companies in the world today.

TAP M&E Brazil has around 2,650 employees distributed among two large Maintenance Centers – at Rio de Janeiro-Galeão and Porto Alegre airports. It has several specialized shops and calibration laboratories. TAP M&E Brazil also provides line maintenance for narrow and wide body aircraft at 35 airports in Brazil.

Its services are certified by the main aeronautical authorities in the world: the ANAC in Brazil, FAA, in United States, EASA, in Europe and those of all countries where it has customers.

TAP M&E Brazil will be included in the proposed privatization package of TAP Portugal.

TAP M&E Brazil has a capability list of more than 10,000 items, and is certified in the following aircraft:
Boeing 707
Boeing 727-100/-200
Boeing 737-200/-300/-400/-500/ NG-700/-800/-900/BBJs
Boeing 747-100/-200/-300
Boeing 757
Boeing 767
Boeing 777
McDonnell Douglas DC-10
McDonnell Douglas MD-11
Embraer EMB 120 Brasilia
Embraer ERJ 145 family
Embraer 170 family
Embraer Legacy 600
Fokker 50
Fokker 100
Airbus A300
Airbus A310
Airbus A320 family
Airbus A330
Airbus A340
Gulfstream III
Gulfstream IV
Gulfstream V

Some of TAP M&E Brazil's main clients are:
Aerolíneas Argentinas
Air Lease One
Arrow Cargo
ATA
Ansett Worldwide Aviation Services (AWAS)
Bavaria International Aircraft Leasing (BIAL)
Boeing
Centurion Air Cargo
Copa Airlines
Embraer
Euro Atlantic Airways
Express.Net Airlines
Força Aérea Brasileira
Fuerza Aérea del Perú
GE Capital Aviation Services
Gemini Air Cargo
Gol Transportes Aéreos
Israel Aircraft Industries
International Lease Finance Corporation
KD Avia
Lan Chile
OceanAir
Pegasus Air Express
Passaredo
Penta
Pluna

Santa Barbara Airlines
Southern Winds Airlines
TAF Linhas Aéreas
TAAG Angola Airlines
TAM Linhas Aéreas
Thai Airways
Total S.A.

Varig
VarigLog
WebJet Linhas Aéreas

References

External links 
TAP ME
TAP Portugal
TAP M&E Brazil

Aerospace companies
Buildings and structures in Lisbon
TAP Air Portugal